Schumanniophyton is a genus of three species of small tree native to west Africa and belonging to the family Rubiaceae. It contains the following species and varieties:
 Schumanniophyton hirsutum (Hiern) R.D.Good, native from W. Central Tropical Africa to N. Angola.
 Schumanniophyton magnificum (K.Schum.) Harms Forest shrub or small tree, 12–16 ft. high, having soft-wooded stems bearing very large leaves. Flowers white or yellow, in a dense cluster subtended by broad bracts and borne at ends of shoots opposite a single leaf and just above a pair of leaves. Native from Nigeria to N. Angola.
 Schumanniophyton magnificum var. klaineanum (Perre ex A.Chev.) N.Hallé, native to Gabon.
 Schumanniophyton magnificum var. trimerum (R.D.Good) N.Hallé, native to W. Central Tropical Africa.
 Schumanniophyton problematicum, (A.Chev.) Aubrev.  Forest tree 20–40 ft. high, having large deciduous leaves grouped in threes at the ends of the branches. Flowers yellowish-white, fragrant. Native from Liberia to Ghana.

Taxonomy
The genus was described by Hermann Harms and published in Die Natürlichen Pflanzenfamilien by Adolf Engler and Karl Anton Eugen Prantl 1: 313 in the year 1897.
It is named in honour of German botanist Karl Moritz Schumann (17 June 1851 in Görlitz – 22 March 1904 in Berlin) who served as curator of the Botanisches Museum in Berlin-Dahlem from 1880 until 1894 and also as the first chairman of the Deutsche Kakteen-Gesellschaft (German Cactus Society) which he founded on November 6, 1892.

Uses in traditional medicine
S. magnificum: The bark decoction is used as an enema to treat dysentery and also as a lotion after circumcision having either antiseptic or analgesic properties. The juice of the fresh leaves and extracts prepared from the stem are used in the treatment of snakebite.

Possible entheogen
In a paper on the genus Mostuea (Gelsemiaceae) French botanist, taxonomist and explorer Auguste Chevalier (1873–1956) quotes the Catholic priest and renowned authority on Gabonese language and culture, Father André Raponda-Walker (1871–1968) as placing an unnamed Gabonese species of Schumanniophyton in the same class of sleep-dispelling, aphrodisiac and hallucinogenic plants as Tabernanthe iboga (Apocynaceae) and Mostuea batesii (syn. M. stimulans). The passage runs as follows:
"This root" [that of Mostuea batesii] (writes Father Walker) "is considered to possess an action comparable to those of Tabernanthe iboga and Schumanniophyton. It is a potent aphrodisiac and also a stimulant. During nights set aside for dancing,the Blacks chew the roots, whole or grated, to drive away sleep. But the majority consume them during their dances - either on their own or mixed with Iboga - for the sexual excitement which they cause. Excessive use of this drug can lead to cerebral troubles".
[translated from the French of Auguste Chevalier]

Chemistry
Analyses of Schumanniophyton magnificum have yielded a variety of chromone alkaloids, including schummaniophytine, isoschummaniophytine, N-methyl schummaniophytine, schumaginine, and schumannificine, as well as the related bases trigonelline, rohitukine, and the chromone noreugenin. The n-butanol extract of the root bark of the Cameroonian species has also been shown to contain new chromone glycosides and schummaniofioside A and B.

References 

 
Rubiaceae genera
Taxonomy articles created by Polbot